Jeremy Ryan Hermida (born January 30, 1984) is an American former professional baseball outfielder. He played in Major League Baseball (MLB) for the Florida Marlins, Boston Red Sox, Oakland Athletics, Cincinnati Reds and San Diego Padres, and in Nippon Professional Baseball (NPB) for the Hokkaido Nippon Ham Fighters.

Major League career

Early career
After graduating from Wheeler High School in Marietta, Georgia, Hermida was the Marlins' No. 1 draft pick (11th overall) in the 2002 Major League Baseball draft, signed by Marlin scout, Joel Smith.  He was one of the highest-rated minor league players that season, Hermida was a rising star in minor league baseball before being brought up. The Marlins were not looking for him to make a significant contribution the way Miguel Cabrera did when he was brought up from Double-A in June 2003, but Hermida has been compared to Braves' rookie Jeff Francoeur ever since the two were 14 years old growing up in the Atlanta area. Although the major difference between the two players is Hermida's eye for the strike zone, Hermida is one of the rare few in the minor leagues who was encouraged to swing more and walk less.

Florida Marlins

Called up from the Double-A Carolina Mudcats, Hermida made his major league debut with the Florida Marlins on August 31, 2005. The Marlins promoted Hermida before September 1 so that he would be eligible to be on the Marlins' postseason roster, however the Marlins, who led the wild-card race on September 13, lost 12 of their next 14 games and were eliminated from postseason contention. In his debut, Hermida became the second of only four players in history to hit a grand slam in his first major league at-bat, after Bill Duggleby in 1898, and followed by Kevin Kouzmanoff in 2006 and Daniel Nava in 2010. Hermida is the only player to accomplish this feat as a pinch hitter, coming off St. Louis Cardinals pitcher Al Reyes.

According to the Elias Sports Bureau, the only other player with a grand slam in his first major league at-bat was pitcher Bill Duggleby, who did it for the Philadelphia Phillies at home against the New York Giants in the second inning on April 21, 1898. Duggleby was the winning pitcher that day. However, since then Kevin Kouzmanoff, while on the Cleveland Indians, hit a grand slam on the first pitch of his first major league at-bat against Edinson Vólquez, and Daniel Nava of the Red Sox hit a grand slam on the first pitch of his first major league at-bat against Joe Blanton. (Nava was playing left field for Boston in part because of an injury to Hermida, who was injured in a collision with third baseman Adrián Beltré.) Bobby Bonds of the San Francisco Giants also hit a slam in his first game off Los Angeles Dodgers reliever John Purdin, doing so in his third plate appearance on June 25, 1968, at Candlestick Park, as did the Giants' Brandon Crawford in the third at-bat of his debut May 27, 2011, off Milwaukee Brewers pitcher Shaun Marcum.

In 2007, he led all Major League right fielders in errors, with 9, and had the lowest fielding percentage among them, .966.

Boston Red Sox
On November 5, 2009, Hermida was traded to the Boston Red Sox for left-handed minor league pitchers Hunter Jones and Jose Alvarez.  Hermida played 52 games for the Red Sox in 2010, including 41 starts in left field, batting .203 in 158 at-bats.

On July 31, 2010, Hermida was designated for assignment. On August 31, Hermida was released.

Oakland Athletics
On September 3, 2010, Hermida signed a minor league contract with the Oakland Athletics and appeared in a few games at Triple-A Sacramento before being called to the parent club, where he played in 21 games through the end of the season. He declared for free agency on October 12.

Cincinnati Reds
Hermida signed a minor league contract with the Cincinnati Reds on January 4, 2011, with an invitation to spring training, where Hermida competed for a spot on the bench as a left-handed batter/backup outfielder. Hermida started the season with the Reds' AAA team, the Louisville Bats. On April 18, he was added to the Reds 40-man roster and called up to the Reds after Juan Francisco was put on the disabled list. Hermida played in 10 games before being sent back down to Triple-A on May 4 when Fred Lewis came off the disabled list.  Hermida spent the rest of the season in Louisville, where he was named an International League midseason All-Star.

San Diego Padres
On August 31, 2011, the Padres claimed Hermida off waivers from the Reds.   Hermida finished 2011 with 7 walks and 9 hits, including 1 home run, in 48 plate appearances for the Padres.

Hermida appeared in 13 games for the Padres in April 2012, picking up 6 hits in 24 at-bats.  A strained abductor muscle sent him to the disabled list on April 27.   After missing two months on the DL, he finished his season with the Triple-A Tucson Padres, posting a .252/.318/.358 line in 151 at-bats.  On August 22, he was designated for assignment to clear room on the 40-man roster. He was released on August 28, becoming a free agent.

Cleveland Indians
On February 4, 2013, the Cleveland Indians signed Hermida to a minor league contract.

Milwaukee Brewers
On January 25, 2014, the Milwaukee Brewers signed Hermida to a minor league deal.

Hokkaido Nippon-Ham Fighters
On December 12, 2014, he was released by the Brewers and signed with the Hokkaido Nippon-Ham Fighters of Japan's Nippon Professional Baseball. He became a free agent after the 2015 season.

See also

 List of players with a home run in first major league at-bat

References

External links

1984 births
Living people
Florida Marlins players
Boston Red Sox players
Oakland Athletics players
Cincinnati Reds players
San Diego Padres players
Baseball players from Atlanta
Baseball players from Marietta, Georgia
Major League Baseball outfielders
Gulf Coast Marlins players
Jamestown Jammers players
Greensboro Bats players
Jupiter Hammerheads players
Albuquerque Isotopes players
Carolina Mudcats players
Portland Sea Dogs players
Pawtucket Red Sox players
Sacramento River Cats players
Louisville Bats players
Tucson Padres players
Columbus Clippers players
Nashville Sounds players
American expatriate baseball players in Japan
Nippon Professional Baseball outfielders